

This is a list of the National Register of Historic Places listings in San Diego County, California.

This is intended to be a complete list of the properties and districts on the National Register of Historic Places in San Diego County, California, United States. Latitude and longitude coordinates are provided for many National Register properties and districts; these locations may be seen together in an online map.

There are 154 properties and districts listed on the National Register in the county, including 17 National Historic Landmarks.  Another 4 properties were once listed but have been removed.

Current listings

|}

Former listings

|}

See also

California Historical Landmarks in San Diego County, California
List of San Diego Historic Landmarks
List of San Diego Historical Landmarks in La Jolla
List of San Diego Historic Landmarks in the Point Loma and Ocean Beach areas
List of National Historic Landmarks in California

References

 
San Diego
Buildings and structures in San Diego County, California

NRHP

National Register San Diego County